Minister Road is a residential suburb in Hyderabad, India.

It is very close to Hussain Sagar Lake.

Commercial area
This is the main Automobile spare parts & Accessory market in Secunderabad. There are many small shops in the area. But the choice is great in the neighboring suburb of Begumpet.

Transport
The closest MMTS train station is at James Street.

The state-owned TSRTC runs the city bus service, connecting to all the major centres of the city.

Neighbourhoods in Hyderabad, India